Falken may refer to:

 Falken (bulletin board system)
 Falken Tire, a brand of tires
 SK Falken, a Norwegian speed skating club 
 Svenska Aero Falken, a Swedish trainer aircraft

See also

 Falcon
 Falke family